Sathya is an Indian Tamil television soap opera, starring Ayesha and Vishnu. The series airs on Zee Tamil and is also streamed on the digital platform ZEE5. The series premiered on 4 March 2019. It is an official remake of the Odia series Sindura Bindu. The story of Sathya, a tomboy, who looks after all the responsibilities of a head of the family. Later, with some major twists and turns of events, she marries Prabhu, a rich man with a big family.

The series follows two seasons, the first season was ended October 24, 2021 by the separation of Sathya and Prabhu and the second season Sathya 2 started from October 25, 2021. and it mainly focus on how Prabhu and Sathya will unite.

Plot
Sathya is a brave tomboy, who enjoys her life as it comes. She lives with her mother, grandmother and her money-minded elder sister Divya. She owns her late father's mechanic shed. She is always ready to help others at moments notice. Soon, Sathya meets a rich businessman, Prabhu and they become friends. Eventually, Sathya realizes her feelings for Prabhu. Elsewhere Prabhu's marriage is fixed with Divya. Sathya is unaware about Prabhu and Divya's marriage, but is left heartbroken after learning this.

On the wedding day, Divya is kidnapped by her ex-fiancé, Bala and later she meets with an accident. Then, Sathya's grandmother reveals that Sathya is Divya's sister, which shocks Prabhu and his family. However, Prabhu and Sathya get married unwillingly, as they are forced by their families to save the family honour. After marriage Sathya's mother Janaki apologises to her for the way she treated her before and advices on how to behave with the new family.

Despite the treacheries done by Prabhu's Sister and Uncle to throw Sathya out of Prabhu's life, because she is against their evil selfish interests. Sathya outsmarts them by her wit. Sathya generously forgives them and hides many of their wrong-doings from Prabhu. But the 'bad company' takes this as an advantage.

Nearly a year after marriage, Sathya is accepted by Prabhu and they live happily. Soon after, Divya returns and she too joins the 'bad company' and tries to create problems between Sathya and Prabhu, but all in vain. Finally, Sathya becomes pregnant and Prabhu is excited and gets over protective of her. However, when Prabhu is in danger, as planned by the 'bad company', Sathya comes out of her confinement and saves Prabhu from being killed and in the process she loses her baby.

Fallen to treachery, Prabhu banishes Sathya from house blaming her for the miscarriage, but actually Prabhu has unintentionally hit Sathya by his car, causing to abortion. Sathya hides the truth and feels guilty for not adhering to Prabhu's advices. Sathya and Prabhu get separated due to Prabhu's arrogance.

Cast

Main 
 Ayesha as Sathya aka Rowdy Baby – A tomboy mechanic; Janaki and Vadivelu's younger daughter; Divya's sister; Prabhu's wife. (2019–2021)
 Vishnu as Prabhu aka Amul Baby – A naive business tycoon; Shanmugasundaram and Indumathi's younger son; Anita and Vignesh's brother; Divya's ex-fiancé; Sathya's husband. (2019–2021)

Recurring 
 Indran as Sasi aka Kullabotham – Sujatha's son; Prabhu's best friend; Meera's love interest; Selvi's husband. (2019–2021)
 Santhosh as Kathir – Sathya's brotherly friend; Meena's brother; Sowmya's husband. (2019–2021)
 Shalini Sundar / Preethi Pritu / Sandhya Dhaiyan as Sowmya – Sadhasivam and Nirmala's daughter; Saravanan's sister; Kathir's wife. (2019–2021)
 Yuvashree as Indhumathi – Shanthi Devi and Devika's sister; Shanmugam's wife; Vignesh, Anitha's mother. (2019–2021)
 S. Rajasekar / Anbalaya Prabhakaran as Shanmugasundaram – Sadhasivam's brother; Indhumathi's widower; Vignesh, Anitha and Prabhu's father. (2019) / (2019–2021) 
 Srividya Natrajan as Anitha – Shanmugasundaram and Indumati's daughter; Prabhu and Vignesh's sister; Veerasingham's wife. (2019–2021)
 Pondy Ravi / Poraali Dileepan as Veerasingam – Pooja's brother; Anitha's husband. (2019) / (2019–2021)
 Visalakshi Manikandan as Nirmala – Sadhasivam's wife; Saravanan and Sowmya's mother. (2019–2021)
 Parthan Siva / Ravishankar as Sadhasivam – Shanmugam's brother; Nirmala's husband; Saravanan and Soumya's father. (2019–2021)
 Nesan as Vignesh – Shanmugasundaram and Indumati's elder son; Anitha and Prabhu's brother; Kavita's husband. (2019–2021)
 Janaki Devi / Ramya Joseph as Kavitha Vignesh – Vignesh's wife. (2019–2021) 
 Seetha as Janaki – Vadivelu's widow; Divya and Sathya's mother. (2019–2021)
 Lakshmi Priya / Geetha Ravishankar as Subalakshmi – Velayutham and Vadivelu's mother; Kumar, Divya and Sathya's grandmother. (2019–2021) 
 Sriram Chandrasekar as Saravanan – Sadhasivam and Nirmala's son; Sowmya's brother (2020–2021)
 Dhakshana as Selvi – Prabhu's ex-house maid; Sasi's wife. (2020–2021)
 Yogeshwaran as Bala – Divya's ex-fiancé; Prabhu's ex-friend. (2019–2020)
 Koli Ramya as Divya Vadivelu – Janaki and Vadivelu's elder daughter; Sathya's sister; Prabhu and Bala's ex-fiancée. (2019–2021)
 Sadhishkumar as Makhan – Sathya's friend (2019–present)
 Giri as Papaali – Sathya's friend (2019–present)
 Rajesh as Panaimandai – Sathya's friend (2019–present)
 Sirish as Thakkali – Sathya's friend (2019–present)
 Maadycaleb as Mandaipoonai – Sathya's friend (2019–present)
 Amutha  as Vasanthi – Prabhu's house maid (2019–2021)
 Sujatha as Sujatha – Sasi's mother (2021–2021)
 Rajkanth as Vadivelu – Subalakshmi's younger son; Velayutham's brother; Janaki's husband; Divya and Sathya's father. (Dead) (2019)
 Thidiyan as Kumar – Velayutham's son; Sathya and Divya's cousin. (2020)
 Monohar Meenakshi Krishnan as Velayutham – Subalakshmi's elder son; Vadivelu's brother; Kumar's father. (2019–2020)
 Tharani Devi as Meena – Kathir's sister (2020)
 Chandhrika as Chitra – Kathir's cousin (2020)
 Arjun as Dinesh – Sowmya's fixed fiancé (2020)
 Jenifer Rechaal as Meera – Sasi's love interest (2020)
 Monish as Vinoth – Prabhu's business enemy who saved Divya (2020)
 Preethi as Jenny – Vinoth's wife and Chidambaram's daughter (2020)
 Bala Subramani as Chidambaram – Jenny's father (2020)
 Rakshithakundar as Pooja – Veerasingam's sister (2019)
 Sasirekha as Sudha – Divya's friend (2019)
 Lobo Samy as Lober Samy – MLA of area (2019)
 Deepa Baskar as Deepa – Lober Samy's wife (2019)
 Geetha Narayanan as Minister Saraswathy (2019)
 Santhiya as Maggie – Kuberan's wife (2021)
 N. Ramanagopinath as Dharma (2021)
 Santhosh as Ranjith (2021)
 N.V. Natrajan as EX-MLA Natrajan (2021)

Cameo appearances
 Kathadi Ramamurthy as a fortune-teller who predicted about Prabhu's wife in first episode (2019)
 Shreekumar as IPS Annamalai (2020)
 Dhanalakshmi as Anu (2019)
 Santhosh as Venkat (2019)
 Surjith Ansary as Dhandhapani (2019)
 Sreenidhi Sudarshan as Dhandhapani's wife (2019)
 Diwakar as Ranveer (2019)
 Jai Akash as ASP Rajavaran (2021)

Crossover episodes
This series had a crossover of episodes called Maha Sangamam with Oru Oorla Oru Rajakumari from 3 August 2020 to 16 August 2020. This garnered the top 5 position in the most watched Tamil television programs of the week.

Again, the series had a crossover of episodes called Maha Sangamam with Oru Oorla Oru Rajakumari from 9 January 2021 to 7 February 2021 with 30 episodes.

Awards and nominations

Music

References

External links 

 Sathya at ZEE5

Zee Tamil original programming
Tamil-language television shows
Tamil-language romance television series
2019 Tamil-language television series debuts
Tamil-language sequel television series
2021 Tamil-language television series endings
Television shows set in Tamil Nadu
Tamil-language television series based on non-Tamil-language television series